Arthur Lovett Garford (August 4, 1858 – January 23, 1933) was a noted industrialist, inventor, and politician.  Today, Garford's home serves as the Hickories Museum and home of the Lorain County Historical Society.

Biography
Garford was born on August 4, 1858, in Elyria, Ohio. As an 1875 graduate of Elyria High School, he began his career as a cashier and bookkeeper before he started the Garford Manufacturing Company in Elyria in 1892 and became the inventor of the first padded bicycle seat, known as the 'Garford Saddle'. Over 1 million saddles were sold in the first few years, which allowed Garford to form the American Saddle Company.

Automobile industry 
After his success in the bicycle industry, Garford moved into automobiles and formed the Automobile and Cycle Parts Company in 1893. The company changed its name to Federal Manufacturing Company, and within a few years, Garford resigned his interest in it and went on to form the Garford Company. The Studebaker Company became interested in Garford's automobile parts company and together they formed a partnership.  Garford engaged to become president or founder of several manufacturing firms including the American Lace Manufacturing Company, the Republican Printing Company, and the Cleveland Automatic Machine Company.

By the early 1900s, Garford had gained wealth and a reputation as a businessman. He helped found the first Chamber of Commerce in Elyria. In 1896 and again in 1908, Garford served as an Ohio delegate to the Republican National Convention. He ran and lost a bid for Ohio Governor in 1912 and the U.S. Senate in 1914 under the Progressive Party.

He died on January 23, 1933.

See also

 Studebaker-Garford
 Garford Motor Truck Co.

References 

1858 births
1933 deaths
19th-century American inventors
People from Elyria, Ohio
American automotive pioneers
Ohio Republicans
Ohio Progressives (1912)